Haikou Volcanic Cluster Global Geopark, also known as Haikou Scenic-Shishan Volcano Cluster, Leiqiong Global Geopark, Haikou Crater Park, and Hainan Crater Park is a national park located approximately 8 mi south of Haikou, Hainan, China. It is named for a crater, one of many extinct volcanoes on the island.

The park has a total area of 118 square kilometres. It contains the two towns Shishan Town and Yongxing Town, and more than 40 Quaternary volcanoes. Part of the area is called Mount Maanling (Saddle) Crater Scenic Area. This area consists of the two major volcanoes, Mount Fengliung (furnace) and Mount Baoziling. Together they appear as a saddle, hence the name. Adjacent to these, there are another two volcanoes, one of which is called Mount Yanjinglin.

See also
 Hainan Volcanic Field
 List of volcanoes in China
 List of UNESCO Global Geoparks in Asia

References

External links

 Image
 Global Geoparks Network
 Global Network of National Geoparks

National parks of China
Nature conservation in China
Protected areas of China
Landforms of Hainan
Tourist attractions in Haikou
Volcanoes of China